"Traitor" is the seventh episode of the eighth season of the anthology television series American Horror Story. It aired on October 24, 2018, on the cable network FX. The episode was written by Adam Penn, and directed by Jennifer Lynch.

Plot
Voodoo queen Dinah Stevens is seen performing a ritual on a man who is guilty of having extramarital sex. Dinah gets paid by the cheated wife and surprises her with the woman's ripped-out heart which she puts in a blender, together with some other concoctions. After forcing the husband to swallow the potion, Dinah leaves and is confronted outside by Cordelia. The witch reveals she needs Dinah's help with summoning Papa Legba in order to stop Michael.

On the set of a slasher movie, witch actress Bubbles McGee is visited by Madison. The ex-coven member is needed back within the circle in order to use her power of thought reading on Ariel Augustus and Baldwin Pennypacker. Meanwhile, Cordelia and Dinah summon Papa Legba who is accompanied by the soul of dead witch Nan. Cordelia tells Legba about preparing a trap for Michael: banishing him to Hell forever. Legba demands the souls of all the witches in return but the Supreme refuses and Legba disappears.

At Miss Robichaux's, Coco discovers a new power, she can now guess the right calorie content of sweets like muffins. While eating a snowball, Coco begins to choke and dies, but Mallory opens Coco's neck and removes the snowball and saves her life. Zoe thinks it's rather Mallory than Michael who's responsible for Cordelia's supreme powers decreasing. Bubbles prepares a meal and dines with Ariel, Baldwin and Myrtle. Bubbles learns about the planned death of fellow warlock John Henry Moore and about the warlocks' urge to kill all the witches through her powers.

The coven travels to the gas station where Moore was killed in order for Mallory to bring him back. Mallory brings the warlock back to life and therefore accomplishes her last task of The Seven Wonders. Coco is given the task of tracking down Mead, who killed Moore. When Coco confronts the satanist, Mead shoots the witch with a tranquilizer gun but two of the coven's albinos appear and kidnap Mead. Cordelia and Myrtle capture Baldwin and Ariel, who were planning to kill the witches with a poisonous chemical. Along with Mead, the warlocks are burned at the stake by Moore for their betrayals.

Reception
"Traitor" was watched by 1.85 million people during its original broadcast, and gained a 0.9 ratings share among adults aged 18–49.

The episode received positive reviews from critics. On the review aggregator Rotten Tomatoes, "Traitor" holds an 87% approval rating, based on 15 reviews with an average rating of 6/10. The critical consensus reads, "Tricky table setting doesn't stop "Traitor" from having its cake and eating it too, skillfully returning to campy form with ample gore and a wholly reunited coven."

Ron Hogan of Den of Geek gave the episode a 3/5, saying, "The stylistic choices—especially the 70's style film segment and the voodoo-themed cold opening—work really well. Lynch has a great eye, and she's adept at the house style of American Horror Story, particularly the newsreel of John Henry's resurrection. She also has a great handle on the actors involved, and the choice to have Miriam face her fiery death with a gleeful grin was a brilliant one. She might not have magical powers or be the child of Satan, but there's something truly evil about her that gives her true power that the others cannot replicate."

Kat Rosenfield from Entertainment Weekly gave the episode an B. She criticized the scene with Papa Legba and Nan, commenting that it "serves mostly as fan service [...] and the plot of the series advances by, like, a millimeter." She was also not a fan of the multiple plot conveniences, like during the dinner scene with the warlocks or how Coco somehow located Mead. However, she enjoyed Collins' new character, calling her "an aging glamazon" and "a useful asset for the coven’s next play". She also praised the development of Dinah' character, but also the characters of Mallory and Behold.

Vultures Ziwe Fumudoh gave the episode a 4 out of 5. She particularly enjoyed the final scene of the episode, commenting that it is "when we see the witches in all their badass glory". She also appreciated the fact that the character of John Henry was not forgotten, and the developments of Mallory and Dinah. However, she criticized the character of Coco, saying that she is "like the Weight Watchers of witches, which isn't particularly interesting", and the dinner scene with the warlocks.

References

External links

 

American Horror Story: Apocalypse episodes